Clypeaster durandi is a species of sea urchins of the Family Clypeasteridae. Their armour is covered with spines. Clypeaster durandi was first scientifically described in 1959 by Cherbonnier.

See also 

 Clypeaster chesheri
 Clypeaster cyclopilus
 Clypeaster elongatus

References

Animals described in 1959
Clypeaster